Tanya Chua (born 28 January 1975) is a Singaporean singer-songwriter. She launched her singing career by releasing her debut studio album Bored in 1997. Her albums, Amphibian (2005), Goodbye & Hello (2007), Sing It Out of Love (2011) and Depart (2021), each won her a Golden Melody Award for Best Mandarin Female Singer award.

A veteran in the industry with a career spanning more than two decades, Chua is the first and only person to win the Best Mandarin Female Singer award four times at the Golden Melody Awards, and has achieved popularity in Greater China and among the Chinese-speaking world.

Life and career

1975–1996: Early years and career beginnings 
Chua was born in Singapore on 28 January 1975. She attended CHIJ Saint Nicholas Girls' School, and achieved a diploma in business administration at Singapore Polytechnic in 1996.

1997–2002: Universal Music 
In 1997, Chua signed a recording deal with Singaporean management company Music & Movement, and debuted her singing career by releasing an English album titled Bored. In 1998, she attended the electric guitar classes at Musicians Institute in Los Angeles. In 1999, Chua signed a recording deal with PolyGram, and released her first self-titled Mandarin album. In the same year, she released her second English album Luck. The song "The Wicked Signs of Trying to Be a Superstar" was written by Taiwanese singer-songwriter David Tao.

In March 2000, Chua released her second Mandarin album Remember under Universal Music Group which acquired PolyGram on the same year. The album earned her a nomination for Best New Artist at the 11th Golden Melody Awards. In the same year, she wrote the theme song of the Singaporean film Chicken Rice War, and appeared on the film herself. In 2001, Chua released her third Mandarin album I Do Believe which earned her a nomination for Best Mandarin Female Singer at the 13th Golden Melody Awards. In the same year, she performed in the Singapore National Day Parade with her self-written theme song titled "Where I Belong". In 2002, Japanese record label S2S released an English album titled Secret Lavender which contained seven songs from Chua. Her composition "Wrong Number" for Chinese singer Faye Wong earned her a Golden Melody Award nomination for Best Composition.

2003–2006: Warner Music 
In 2003, Chua signed a recording deal with Warner Music Taiwan, and released her fourth Mandarin album Stranger which earned her a nomination for Best Mandarin Female Singer at the 15th Golden Melody Awards. In the same year, she released her fourth English album Jupiter. In 2004, Chua produced Hong Kong singer Gigi Leung's album Belongingness. In 2005, Chua released her fifth Mandarin album Amphibian. At the 17th Golden Melody Awards, she won her first Best Mandarin Female Singer award along with other nominations for Best Pop Vocal Album and Best Album Producer. In 2006, Chua moved to Taipei, and launched her own music production company Tangy Music.

2007–2015: AsiaMuse Entertainment 
In May 2007, Chua signed a recording deal with Taiwanese record label AsiaMuse Entertainment. The following month, she was featured as  background vocals in Taiwanese singer Chang Chen-yue's song "Yearning Is a Kind of Sickness". In October of the same year, she released her sixth Mandarin album Goodbye & Hello which earned her two awards for Best Mandarin Female Singer and Best Album Producer out of seven nominations at the 19th Golden Melody Awards.

In 2008, Chua released her live album My Space which was nominated for Best Mandarin Female Singer at the 20th Golden Melody Awards.

In 2009, Chua released her seventh Mandarin album If You See Him. The album earned her four nominations including Best Mandarin Album, Best Mandarin Female Singer, Best Album Producer, and Best Composition at the 21st Golden Melody Awards. The album also won her a Hong Kong Top Sales Music Award for Ten Best Sales Releases Mandarin. In 2010, Chua produced Chinese singer Na Ying's album So What. In 2011, Chua released her eighth Mandarin album Sing It Out of Love. She made history of becoming the first person to win the Best Mandarin Female Singer award thrice at the 23rd Golden Melody Awards, along with seven other nominations for that album. In the same year, she released her fifth English album Just Say So.

In 2013, Chua released her ninth Mandarin album Angel vs. Devil, which earned her a nomination for Best Mandarin Female Singer at the 25th Golden Melody Awards. In the same year, she became one of the judges in the Chinese singing contest Sing My Song with Liu Huan, Yang Kun, and Emil Chau. In 2015, she came back as one of the judges in the second season of the show. In November of the same year, Chua released her tenth Mandarin album Aphasia which earned her six nominations at the 27th Golden Melody Awards. Subsequently, her contract with AsiaMuse Entertainment expired.

2018–present: Return to Universal Music 
In July 2017, Chua re-signed a recording deal with Universal Music. The following year, Chua released her eleventh Mandarin album Kisses for the World. The lead single from the album "The Will" earned her a Best Composition nomination at the 30th Golden Melody Awards. Chua also sang Nightglow, the official theme song for miHoYo's mobile ACG title Honkai Impact 3 second CG: Final Lesson.

In 2020, her concert tour "Kisses for the World" was announced. Tickets for the show sold out within 5 minutes but was postponed from May 2020 to January 2021 due to the ongoing COVID-19 pandemic. In August of the same year, Chua started writing songs for her twelfth Mandarin album DEPART which was released in August 2021. At the 33rd Golden Melody Awards, Chua won four out of eight nominations, including three major awards for Best Female Mandarin Singer, Best Mandarin Album and Album of the Year for the album. The win for Best Female Mandarin Singer award made Chua the most awarded artist in the category, breaking her tie with A-mei, with four wins.

Discography

Studio albums

Mandarin-language studio albums 
 Tanya (1999)
 Remember (2000)
 I Do Believe (2001)
 Stranger (2003)
 Amphibian (2005)
 Goodbye & Hello (2007)
 If You See Him (2009)
 Sing It Out of Love (2011)
 Angel vs. Devil (2013)
 Aphasia (2015)
 Kisses for the World (2018)
 Depart (2021)

English-language albums 
 Bored (1997)
 Luck (1999)
 Secret Lavender (2002)
 Jupiter (2003)
 Just Say So (2011)

Live albums 

 My Space (2008)

Compilation albums 
 Tacit Understanding (2001)
 T-time (2006)

Singles 
 All Right (1999)
 Where I Belong (2001)
 Treasure the World (2003)
 Purple (2017)
 Nightglow (2018)
 Love Will Empower Your Life (2023)

Awards and nominations

Asia Song Festival

Golden Melody Awards

References

External links

 
 
 

1975 births
Living people
CHIJ Saint Nicholas Girls' School alumni
Mandopop singer-songwriters
Musicians Institute alumni
Singaporean composers
21st-century Singaporean women singers
Singaporean Mandopop singers
Singaporean people of Chinese descent
Singaporean singer-songwriters